Kehinde Ganiyu Aweda (born 1 January 1975) is a Nigerian boxer. He competed in the men's bantamweight event at the 1996 Summer Olympics.

References

External links
 

1975 births
Living people
Nigerian male boxers
Olympic boxers of Nigeria
Boxers at the 1996 Summer Olympics
Place of birth missing (living people)
Bantamweight boxers